Tibbee Creek is a stream in the U.S. state of Mississippi.

Tibbee is a name derived from the Choctaw language purported to mean "icy water". Variant names are "Oktibbeha Creek", "Tibbee River", and "Tibby Creek".

References

Rivers of Mississippi
Rivers of Clay County, Mississippi
Rivers of Lowndes County, Mississippi
Mississippi placenames of Native American origin